The Battle of Guler was fought between forces led by Sikh Guru Gobind Singh and Mughal forces, aided by the Rajas of the Sivalik Hills.

Background and Battle
In an expedition against Guru Gobind Singh, Rustom Khan failed and he returned in shame. Therefore, General Hussain Khan marched to besiege Anandpur. On his way, Mudhkar Shah (ruler of Dadwal) along with his sons were defeated by Khan. Moreover, others Like Chand Katoch of Kangra and Bhim Chand of Bilaspur submitted before Mughal army without fight. Hussain Khan demanded certain amount from the rajas. Raja of Guler State brought less money than demanded by Khan. In anger Raja Gopal's fort was besieged.

Guru Gobind Singh sent his men to help the raja of Guler. A fierce battle was fought between Sikhs and Hussain's army southeast of Pathankot at Guler in which Hussain Khan and his coalition rajas Kirpal Chand Katoch and Himmat Singh were killed by Guru's forces. Guru mentioned the battle in Bachitra Natak also.

References

Guler
Guler
Conflicts in 1696
1696 in India
History of Himachal Pradesh